Emil Ludwig (25 January 1881 – 17 September 1948) was a German-Swiss author, known for his biographies and study of historical "greats."

Biography 
Emil Ludwig (originally named Emil Cohn) was born in Breslau, now part of Poland, on 25 January 1881. Born into a Jewish family, he was raised as a non-Jew but was not baptized. “Many persons have become Jews since Hitler," he said. "I have been a Jew since the murder of Walther Rathenau [in 1922], from which date I have emphasized that I am a Jew.” Ludwig studied law but chose writing as a career. At first he wrote plays and novellas, also working as a journalist. In 1906, he moved to Switzerland, but, during World War I, he worked as a foreign correspondent for the Berliner Tageblatt in Vienna and Istanbul. He became a Swiss citizen in 1932, later emigrating to the United States in 1940.

After the 1921 trial of Soghomon Tehlirian for the assassination of Talat Pasha, the main architect of the Armenian genocide, Ludwig wrote, "Only when a society of nations has organized itself as the protector of international order will no Armenian killer remain unpunished, because no Turkish Pasha has the right to send a nation into the desert".

During the 1920s, he achieved international fame for his popular biographies which combined historical fact and fiction with psychological analysis. After his biography of Goethe was published in 1920, he wrote several similar biographies, including one about Bismarck (1922–24) and another about Jesus (1928). As Ludwig's biographies were popular outside of Germany and were widely translated, he was one of the fortunate émigrés who had an income while living in the United States. His writings were considered particularly dangerous by Goebbels, who mentioned him in his journal.

Ludwig interviewed Benito Mussolini and on 1 December 1929 Mustafa Kemal Atatürk. His interview with the founder of the Republic of Turkey appeared in Wiener Freie Presse in March 1930, addressing issues of religion and music. He also interviewed Joseph Stalin in Moscow on 13 December 1931. An excerpt from this interview is included in Stalin's book on Lenin. Ludwig describes this interview in his biography of Stalin.

Ludwig's extended interviews with T.G. Masaryk, founder and longtime president of Czechoslovakia, appeared as Defender of Democracy in 1936.

At the end of the Second World War, he went to Germany as a journalist, and it is to him that we owe the retrieving of Goethe's and Schiller's coffins, which had disappeared from Weimar in 1943/44. He returned to Switzerland after the war and died in 1948, in Moscia, a neighborhood, part of the commune of Ascona, in the canton of Ticino, which is the Italian part of Switzerland. In 1944, Ludwig wrote a letter to The New York Times where he urged that "Hitler’s fanaticism against the Jews could be exploited by the Allies. The Three Powers should send a proclamation to the German people through leaflets and to the German Government through neutral countries; threatening that further murdering of Jews would involve terrible retaliation after victory. This would drive a wedge into the already existing dissension of the generals and the Nazis, and also between ultra-Nazis and other Germans.”

In a May 1948 Tempo magazine article, Ludwig theorized that Hitler could have survived by having a body double killed and cremated in his place. The same year, presiding judge at the Einsatzgruppen trial at Nuremberg Michael Musmanno dismissed Ludwig's theory in an article stating his own definitive view that Hitler had died; Musmanno elaborated these opinions in a book two years later.

Ludwig died in his sleep near Ascona on 17 September 1948.

French and English editions of works by Ludwig 
The following French editions of Emil Ludwig's books were published in the period 1926–1940: Biographies: Goethe (3 volumes), Napoléon, Bismarck, Trois Titans, Lincoln, Le Fils de l'Homme, Le Nil (2 volumes). Political works: Guillaume II, Juillet 1914, Versailles, Hindenburg, Roosevelt, Barbares et Musiciens, La Conquête morale de l'Allemagne, Entretiens avec Mussolini, La Nouvelle Sainte-Alliance.

Biographies of Goethe, Napoleon, Bismarck and Wilhelm Hohenzollern are available in English from G. P. Putnam's Sons (New York and London).

Emil Ludwig was – and remains – renowned for a popular biography of Napoleon published in English in 1926, just after it was published in Germany in the original German, while Ludwig was still living there. This book is still quite readable today – Ludwig has a rare gift of evoking a vanished era in straightforward plain prose. The book has a rare quality of immediacy, as if what Ludwig writes of were almost current history. Napoleon was published by Boni & Liveright, a New York publishing house renowned for titles of intellectual and scholarly interest in its day.

Writing style for Napoleon 
Ludwig describes the characters using accurate vocabulary and dramatic quotes and sentences. His ability to combine facts with popular stories and rumors in his novel "Napoleon"  makes the entire book a detailed odyssey. The explicit descriptions and psychological interpretations in his books make it appear as if the characters were heroes. His unique writing style simplifies the intricate political activities of that time in an interesting and readable manner.

Books 
 Leaders of Europe, Ivor Nicholson and Watson Ltd. (1934), translated by James Murphy
 Bismarck
 Cleopatra
 Diana
 Genius and Character
 Gifts of Life
 Goethe
 Hindenburg William Heinemann Ltd. (1935), translated by Eden and Cedar Paul
 July '14 (1929)
 Kaiser Wilhelm II: Wilhelm Hohenzollern (1926)
 Nine Etched from Life
 Lincoln
 Napoleon (1922)
 On Mediterranean Shores
 The Practical Wisdom of Goethe
 Schliemann
 Son of Man (Jesus)
 Talks with Mussolini
 Three Titans
 The Davos Murder
 Defender of Democracy
 Masaryk of Czechoslovakia
 The Nile: The Life-Story of a River, The Viking Press (1937), translated by Mary H. Lindsay
 Mackenzie King. A Portrait Sketch (1944)
 Rembrandts Schicksal (1923)
 Three Titans: Michael Angelo, Rembrandt, Beethoven. (1930)
"Wagner: oder Die Entzauberten" (F. Lehmann, 1913)
″ Otelo″
"Bolivar and Napoleon" 1939

See also 
 Exilliteratur

References

External links 
 
 
 
 Ludwig's interview with Stalin
 Omitted section of Ludwig's interview with Stalin
 Talks with Mussolini
 Guide to the Papers of Emil Ludwig (1881-1948) at the Leo Baeck Institute, New York.
 

1881 births
1948 deaths
Writers from Wrocław
People from the Province of Silesia
German biographers
Male biographers
German war correspondents
War correspondents of World War I
Converts to Protestantism from Judaism
Converts to Judaism from Protestantism
Jewish writers
Exilliteratur writers
Jewish emigrants from Nazi Germany to the United States
20th-century biographers
German male novelists
German male dramatists and playwrights
20th-century German novelists
20th-century German dramatists and playwrights
20th-century German male writers
 Rembrandt scholars